The Wyong River is a perennial river that is located in the Central Coast region of New South Wales, Australia.

Course and features
The Wyong River rises below Watagan Mountains west of Martinsville, and flows generally south and southeast, joined by three minor tributaries, before reaching its river mouth within Tuggerah Lake, near Tacoma. The river descends  over its  course.

The merged flows of the Wyong River together with Tuggerah Lake reaches the Tasman Sea of the South Pacific Ocean at The Entrance.

The Pacific Motorway crosses the river west of Wyong.

See also 

 Budgewoi Lake
 List of rivers of Australia
 List of rivers of New South Wales (L–Z)
 Rivers of New South Wales

References

External links
 

 

Rivers of New South Wales
Central Coast (New South Wales)
Central Coast Council (New South Wales)